Andrea Kilday (born 5 August 1982) is a female Taekwondo fighter from Auckland, New Zealand.

She won gold at the 2015 Pacific Games.

At the 2016 Oceania Taekwondo Olympic Qualification Tournament, Kilday won gold to qualify to compete at the 2016 Olympics.  She qualified for the 2008 Olympics, but was not ultimately selected to compete.

References

Living people
1982 births
New Zealand female taekwondo practitioners
Olympic taekwondo practitioners of New Zealand
Taekwondo practitioners at the 2016 Summer Olympics
21st-century New Zealand women